The Granada Theatre is a theatre in Sherbrooke, Quebec, Canada.

The Granada Theatre was listed as a National Historic Site of Canada on June 5, 1996.

The building was designed in the Spanish Revival style by Daniel J. Crighton with its interior decor by prolific theatre decorator Emmanuel Briffa.

History
It was built as an atmospheric theatre in 1928 by United Amusement Corporation Limited, a subsidiary of Famous Players. It was inaugurated on January 18, 1929.

During the 1970s, the opening of movie theatres in shopping centers in suburban areas are made at the expense of the existing downtown movie theaters. Film showings became increasingly rare.

In 1998, the city of Sherbrooke bought the theater in order to protect the building.

References

External links
 

National Historic Sites in Quebec
Buildings and structures in Sherbrooke
Theatres in Quebec
Theatres completed in 1929
Atmospheric theatres
Former cinemas in Canada
Culture of Sherbrooke
Spanish Revival architecture
Theatres on the National Historic Sites of Canada register